Edgerton High School is a high school located in Edgerton, Wisconsin. Edgerton High School's mascot is the Crimson Tide.

History
In 1890 Edgerton High School was at the center of a controversy about the separation of church and state, resulting in the landmark "Edgerton Bible Case."

Sports
Edgerton High School won the Class B state baseball championship in 1990, defeating Luxemburg-Casco 1–0 in the title game.

Notable alumni
 Rich Bickle - professional race car driver
 Derek Carrier - NFL football player for the San Francisco 49ers and Washington Redskins
 Ryan Fox - US national team rower
 Steve Stricker - professional golfer

References

Public high schools in Wisconsin
Schools in Dane County, Wisconsin
Schools in Rock County, Wisconsin